Claudia Jean Clevenger (born January 19, 1955), also known by her married name Claudia Hernandez, is an American former competition swimmer and world record-holder.  Clevenger represented the United States at the 1972 Summer Olympics in Munich, Germany.  She finished fourth in the final of the women's 200-meter breaststroke with a time of 2:42.88.

See also
 World record progression 4 × 100 metres medley relay

References

1955 births
Living people
American female breaststroke swimmers
World record setters in swimming
Olympic swimmers of the United States
Swimmers from San Jose, California
Swimmers at the 1972 Summer Olympics
20th-century American women